Janusz Stanisław Pasierb (7 January 1929 – 15 December 1993), Polish Catholic priest, poet and writer, historian.

1929 births
1993 deaths
20th-century Polish Roman Catholic priests
20th-century Polish historians
Polish male non-fiction writers
20th-century Polish male writers